The 1955 Ole Miss Rebels football team represented the University of Mississippi during the 1955 college football season. The Rebels were led by ninth-year head coach Johnny Vaught and played their home games at Hemingway Stadium in Oxford, Mississippi (and one alternate site game in Jackson, Mississippi). Ole Miss was champion of the Southeastern Conference for the second consecutive season, finishing the regular season with a record of 9–1 (5–1 SEC), ranked 10th in the final AP Poll. They were invited to the 1956 Cotton Bowl Classic, where they defeated 
TCU, 14–13.

Schedule

Roster
OL Buddy Alliston
FB Paige Cothren, Jr.
OL Ed Crawford
QB Eagle Day, Sr.
FB Billy Kinard
Billy Lott
Ray Poole (asst coach)
OL Bill Yelverton

References

Ole Miss
Ole Miss Rebels football seasons
Southeastern Conference football champion seasons
Cotton Bowl Classic champion seasons
Ole Miss Rebels football